Phoenix is a Logie Award-winning Australian crime drama television series broadcast by the Australian Broadcasting Corporation from 1992 to 1993. It was created by Alison Nisselle and Tony McDonald.

The first series recounts the investigation of the bombing of a Victorian police social function, loosely based on the real life Russell Street Bombing in 1986. It was followed by a second series, Phoenix II, based on a series of violent aggravated burglaries ("ag burgs") against wealthy senior citizens.

The series was filmed in Melbourne, Victoria and was characterised by its dark, noir-ish visual tone and non-linear editing, reminiscent of the ABC crime dramas Scales of Justice, Blue Murder and Wildside, which all also dealt with corruption in the police force.

The show was lauded for its realistic depiction of police investigation techniques, aided by extensive research by the show's writers. It won several Logie Awards, including Most Outstanding Miniseries Logie in 1993 and 1994, as well as several Australian Film Institute Awards, and the Television or Film Theme of the Year Award at the APRA Music Awards of 1993.

The series spawned the 1994 spin-off Janus, with Simon Westaway reprising his role as Sergeant Peter Faithful.

Cast

Phoenix (1992)
Starring
Paul Sonkkila as Jock Brennan (13 episodes)
Sean Scully as Ian "Goose" Cochrane (13 episodes)
Andy Anderson as Lochie Renford (13 episodes)
Peter Cummins as Superintendent Wallace (13 episodes)
Simon Westaway	as Sergeant Peter "Noddy" Faithful (13 episodes)
Nell Feeney as Megan Edwards (11 episodes)
Susie Edmonds as Carol Cochrane (12 episodes)
Tony Poli as Lazarus "Laz" Carides (10 episodes)

Also starring
Kevin Summers as Colin Toohey (8 episodes)
Dominic Sweeney as Wheels (9 episodes)
David Bradshaw as Senior Detective Andrew "Fluff" Saunders (5 episodes)
George Vidalis as Mick (12 episodes)
Todd Telford as Dennis (5 episodes)
Patrick Ward as Blazo (4 episodes)
Nicholas Politis as Nick (9 episodes)

Phoenix II (1993)
Starring
Simon Westaway	as Sergeant Peter "Noddy" Faithful (13 episodes)
Stuart McCreery as Senior Sergeant Adrian Moon (13 episodes)
David Bradshaw as Senior Detective Andrew "Fluff" Saunders (13 episodes)
Jennifer Jarman-Walker	as Senior Detective Cath Darby (13 episodes)
Peter Cummins as Superintendent Wallace (13 episodes)
Vikki Blanche as Chris Faithful (9 episodes)
Susie Edmonds as Carol Cochrane (9 episodes)
Sean Scully as Ian "Goose" Cochrane (13 episodes)

Also starring
Peter McCauley as Inspector Lew Murdoch (12 episodes)
David Roberts as Detective Robert Howie (10 episodes)
Keith Agius as Docket (13 episodes)
Bob Halsall as Boomer (13 episodes)
Russell Fletcher as Kermie (6 episodes)
Greg Scealey as Fish (7 episodes)
Paul Sonkkila as Jock Brennan (3 episodes)

Episodes

Phoenix (1992)

Phoenix II (1993)

Awards and nominations
Logie Awards
1993: Most Outstanding Series (won)
1994: Most Outstanding Achievement in Drama Production (won)

Home release
The series was released in 2009 by the ABC on DVD in two volumes, each containing 13 episodes across 4 discs. However, it has since gone out of print.

Presently (Feb 2023) available for viewing in Australia on ABC TV iview.

See also
 List of Australian television series

References

External links
 

1990s Australian crime television series
1990s Australian drama television series
Australian Broadcasting Corporation original programming
Television shows set in Victoria (Australia)
1992 Australian television series debuts
1993 Australian television series endings
1992 Australian television seasons
1993 Australian television seasons
APRA Award winners